HMS Hurworth is a  of the British Royal Navy.

Service history
In March 1987, Hurworth was visiting Ostend when the cross channel ferry  capsized leaving Zeebrugge; two of her divers were awarded the Queens Gallantry Medal for their efforts in the rescue.

On 2 March 2009, she was the centrepiece of the festivities to mark the 800th anniversary of the granting of a freedom charter by King John to Great Yarmouth.

Affiliations
 Hurworth-on-Tees, Darlington

References

External links

 

Hunt-class mine countermeasures vessels
1984 ships